Eugene Donald Millikin (February 12, 1891July 26, 1958) was a United States senator from Colorado who served as Senate Republican Conference Chairperson from 1947 to 1956.

Biography
Born in Hamilton, Ohio, Millikin graduated from the law school of the University of Colorado at Boulder in 1913. He was admitted to the bar the same year and commenced practice in Salt Lake City, Utah. He entered politics and served as executive secretary to the Governor from 1915 to 1917. During World War I he enlisted as a private in the Colorado National Guard in 1917, saw action in France and was mustered out as a lieutenant colonel. Millikin resumed the practice of law in Denver, Colorado, and became president of Kinney-Coastal Oil.

Millikin was appointed by Governor Ralph Lawrence Carr on December 20, 1941, and subsequently elected on November 3, 1942, as a Republican to the United States Senate to fill the vacancy in the term ending January 3, 1945, caused by the death of Alva B. Adams. He was reelected in 1944 and 1950, and served in all from December 20, 1941 to January 3, 1957. (He was not a candidate for renomination in 1956).

He served as chairman of the U.S. Senate Committee on Finance, the Senate Republican Conference, the U.S. Senate Joint Committee on Internal Revenue Taxation.

Millikin identified with the conservative wing of the Senate GOP. He also voted for an FEPC bill in 1950 in addition to bolstering President Harry Truman's army desegregation.

In a meeting of the Joint Congressional Committee on Atomic Energy on July 20, 1949 he opposed - supported by Senator Arthur Vandenberg - a cooperation between the US and the UK in the production of atomic weapons because he believed that the American public opinion assumed that the US monopoly possession of atomic weapons gave the US a real advantage in an uncertain world.

Millikin died in Denver in 1958 and was interred in the Fairmount Mausoleum at Fairmount Cemetery in Denver.

References

External links

1891 births
1958 deaths
American military personnel of World War I
Colorado lawyers
Republican Party United States senators from Colorado
Utah lawyers
Colorado Republicans
People from Hamilton, Ohio
United States Army officers
University of Colorado Law School alumni
20th-century American politicians
20th-century American lawyers
Old Right (United States)